Gail Luke (born 25 May 1963) is an Australian hurdler. She competed in the women's 400 metres hurdles at the 1992 Summer Olympics.

References

1963 births
Living people
Athletes (track and field) at the 1992 Summer Olympics
Australian female hurdlers
Olympic athletes of Australia
Place of birth missing (living people)